Still the 12th Man is the third album released by The Twelfth Man. Released in December 1992, the album reached number one on the ARIA Charts in January 1993.

At the ARIA Music Awards of 1993, the album was nominated for ARIA Award for Best Comedy Release.

Plot
A day in the life of Richie Benaud, the "captain" of the Channel 9 cricket commentary team. Resembling a game between Australia and Pakistan, this album includes Bruce Reid literally falling apart, Tony Greig and Bill Lawry hijacking the commentary box and Max Walker streaking and hijacking the commentary box. In fact, it gets so bad for Richie that he has to leave early.

The album also contains the number one single, "Marvellous!".

Track listing
CD (8141392)
 "Still the 12th Man" - 57:52
 "Marvellous!" - 8:12

Charts

Weekly charts

Year-end charts

Certifications

See also
 List of number-one albums of 1993 (Australia)
 List of Top 25 albums for 1993 in Australia

References

1992 albums
The Twelfth Man albums
1990s comedy albums